Richard LaValliere (February 20, 1953 – February 8, 2012) was a Sheboygan, Wisconsin born musician, and founding member of Milwaukee bands such as, The Dirty Shames, Arthur, Radio Boys, In A Hot Coma, The Haskels, The Oil Tasters, The Lonesome Desperados,  The Barn Burners, The Flip Top Five, Triple Forbidden Taboo, Scorpio Thunderbolt, Pölkafinger and Jones & Karloff. He was renowned for his unique vocal style and songwriting, humorous and clever lyrics and stage persona. A multi-instrumentalist, he played bass guitar, lead guitar and keyboards.

References

American rock bass guitarists
American male bass guitarists
Guitarists from Wisconsin
Musicians from Milwaukee
1953 births
2012 deaths
20th-century American bass guitarists
20th-century American male musicians